The Rajbhar (also spelled Rajbhaar) are a community of the state of Uttar Pradesh, Uttarakhand, Jharkhand, Madhya Pradesh, Rajasthan, Gujarat, Maharashtra, Delhi, Haryana, Punjab, Bihar, Nepal and other states of India..  

The rajbhar are traditionally laborers. Influenced by the Arya Samaj movement, bhars started using rajbhar, Baijnath Prasad Adhyapak published Rajbhar Jati ka Itihas in 1940. This book attempted to prove that the Rajbhar were formerly rulers who were related to the ancient Bhar ruler.

References

Other Backward Classes
Social groups of Uttar Pradesh